Market Center may refer to:

 Dallas Market Center
Market Center station, a DART Light Rail station in Dallas
 Medical/Market Center station, a train station in Dallas
 Market Center (San Francisco), a skyscraper complex
 Market Center (Baltimore, Maryland), a national historic district

See also
Market Centre (disambiguation)